Beeban Annadale McKnight  (née McDonald; 16 January 1897 – 6 January 1996) was a New Zealand clerical worker, bank teller, dancer, entertainer, cinema operator and community leader. She was born in Dunedin, New Zealand, on 16 January 1897.

In the 1983 New Year Honours, McKnight was awarded the Queen's Service Medal for community service.

References

1897 births
1996 deaths
Entertainers from Dunedin
New Zealand female dancers
Recipients of the Queen's Service Medal
New Zealand justices of the peace